The following elections occurred in the year 1941.

Africa

 1941 Lagos by-election
 1941 Northern Rhodesian general election

Asia
 1941 Iranian legislative election

Philippines
 1941 Philippine House of Representatives elections
 1941 Philippine Senate election
 1941 Philippine general election
 1941 Philippine presidential election

Europe

United Kingdom
 1941 Berwick-upon-Tweed by-election
 1941 Carmarthen by-election
 1941 Edinburgh Central by-election
 1941 Edinburgh West by-election
 1941 Greenock by-election
 1941 Hampstead by-election
 1941 Mansfield by-election
 1941 Pontefract by-election
 1941 West Bromwich by-election

North America

 1941 Curaçao general election
 1941 Dominican Republic Constitutional Assembly election
 1941 Guatemalan presidential election

Canada
 1941 British Columbia general election
 1941 Edmonton municipal election
 1941 Manitoba general election
 1941 Nova Scotia general election
 1941 Toronto municipal election

South America

 1941 Chilean parliamentary election
 1941 Colombian parliamentary election
 1941 Venezuelan presidential election

Oceania

Australia
 1941 New South Wales state election
 1941 Queensland state election
 1941 South Australian state election
 1941 Tasmanian state election

See also
 :Category:1941 elections

1941
Elections